Robert Robinson McIntosh, known as Robert "Say" McIntosh (born January 16, 1944), is an American political and civil rights activist from his adopted city of Little Rock, Arkansas. He was born in Osceola in eastern Arkansas but reared in the Granite Mountain area of Little Rock. During Bill Clinton's terms as governor, McIntosh was a persistent gadfly for state politicians.

Background
He was the fifth child of eleven. He attended the historically black Horace Mann High School but dropped out in the tenth grade.

Career
McIntosh opened his own restaurant in Little Rock and became known for his sweet potato pie. He first came to public attention when the Arkansas Democrat newspaper named him "Arkansan of the Year" in the late 1970s because he had acted as Little Rock's "Black Santa," quietly taking Christmas gifts to children in housing projects.

The spotlight agreed with him, and he subsequently staged a number of high-profile events that kept him in the public eye. He once catered a Ku Klux Klan convention held in Little Rock "to show them love." He offered to do the same thing for Cuban refugees being held in 1980 at Fort Chaffee in the wake of the Mariel boatlift. The refugees had rioted and many had escaped into the countryside for several days. Camp officials declined McIntosh's offer because they were worried about further unrest. McIntosh's ex-wife later hauled him into court to find out why he was late in his child support payments if he could afford to feed the Cubans. He told the court that he knew officials would not accept his offer, but he did it to generate publicity.

He frequently held sweet potato pie sales to fund his various political campaigns. When Bill Clinton doubled the license plate fee, McIntosh had trouble keeping up with the demand for his pies as Arkansans chose them as a form of protest against Clinton, who lost reelection in 1980 to Republican Frank D. White. That same year, McIntosh sought the Democratic nomination for lieutenant governor and received about 12 percent of the vote in a seven-man race won by Winston Bryant. Later that year he declared himself a Republican and joined the Black Republican Council. He left the council and the party the following summer after a falling out with White and the BRC's leadership, and returned to the Democrats. He also failed in a 1988 bid for the Little Rock City Board of Directors. He considered seeking the 1986 Democratic nomination for governor against incumbent Bill Clinton and former Governor Orval Faubus, but backed out at the last minute when another African-American candidate, former anti-poverty agency head W. Dean Goldsby, filed on the last day.

When a tree ceremoniously planted on the Arkansas capitol grounds on the national holiday to honor Martin Luther King Jr., McIntosh showed up the next day and chopped it down in front of the press: "No black man was invited to be present for the tree planting. I'm cutting it down till blacks are invited to be part of the political process in Little Rock."

He made frequent allegations that Bill Clinton had several affairs around Little Rock and had fathered a child out of wedlock named Danny Williams. (The Star tabloid later determined through a DNA test that Clinton was not Williams' father.) McIntosh posted a flier during Bill Clinton's first presidential campaign which read "The Hottest Thing Going: Bill Clinton's Dick Will Keep Him From Running for President of the United States of America" with a picture of Danny Williams. Secret Service agents were seen around Little Rock with paint scrapers removing the fliers.

Some of his campaigns have resulted in self injury, e.g. he once crucified himself on the capitol steps, strapping himself to a large wooden cross to protest racism by state officials. There was a problem with the setup (he wore thermal underwear on the hottest day of the year, telling reporters they would trap his sweat and keep him cool), and he developed heat stroke and required several days of hospitalization. Earlier in the week, McIntosh set up his cross in front of the Governor's Mansion. Governor White was entertaining foreign dignitaries at the mansion that day, and when they asked him why the man was on a cross outside his residence, White deadpanned: "He displeased me." In 1983, McIntosh placed himself on a cross in front of the Pulaski County Sheriff's office, quickly taking himself down when Sheriff Tommy F. Robinson appeared with a chainsaw to cut him from the wood.

His critics have called him a loose cannon, but few debate that he has been a major part of local color in Arkansas. McIntosh is known as "The Petey Greene" Of Arkansas. John Robert Starr, the longtime managing editor of the since-titled Arkansas Democrat-Gazette, referred to him as "Robert 'You Don't Say' McIntosh", and "McIntrash".

References

External links

"Investigations: The Busybodies on the Bus", by Margaret Carlson, Time, Aug. 12, 1991
Robert "Say" McIntosh Materials, manuscript collection at the Butler Center for Arkansas Studies
Racist Cover-Up in Story of Clinton’s ‘Illegitimate Son’?
Hillary Bio: Bill Traded Pardon for Silence on 'Love Child'
Whitewater & Clinton Scandal Clips

1944 births
Living people
People from Osceola, Arkansas
Activists from Little Rock, Arkansas
American restaurateurs
Activists for African-American civil rights
Arkansas Democrats
Bill Clinton